Federal elections were held in Switzerland on 20 October 2019 to elect all members of both houses of the Federal Assembly. This was followed by the 2019 election to the Swiss Federal Council, the federal executive, by the United Federal Assembly.

In the 20 October elections, the two green parties, the Green Party of Switzerland and the Green Liberal Party of Switzerland, made major electoral gains, taking 13.2% and 7.8% of the vote respectively. As in the previous election, the Swiss People's Party received the most votes, but its share of votes went down to 25.6% from 29.4%.

Initial media coverage interprets the 2019 election results as a "green wave" marking a leftward shift of the Swiss electorate on the political spectrum. It remains to be seen what effect the changes in the relative vote and seat shares will have on the composition of the Federal Council, or at least on the government's agenda and legislative initiatives, if there is no change in party representation in the executive branch.

In contrast to Germany and Austria, the Swiss federal government has for decades been composed of representatives of the four largest parties as a matter of political practice (rather than constitutional design); it has long operated on a consensus-seeking model characterised by accommodation of competing interests and viewpoints, rather than imposition of the will of the majority over the opposition.

Switzerland's confederate structure and frequent initiatives and referendums pose additional constraints on what elected politicians are collectively able to accomplish. For these reasons, the strong electoral gains of the two green parties do not have the same implications for coalition-government formation as they do in Austria following the 29 September 2019 parliamentary elections there, in which the Greens obtained their best results ever with 13.9% of the vote and 26 seats in a slightly smaller lower house of Parliament.

Date
The elections for the National Council took place nationally on 20 October 2019.

The cantons individually organise their elections for the Council of States, which all held on 20 October 2019, with one exception. In Appenzell Innerrhoden the election took place on 28 April at the 2019 Landsgemeinde. Depending on the results of the 20 October election, a second round or runoff election may be required in some cantons.

Electoral system 

The 200 members of the National Council are elected from 26 cantons, each of which constitutes a constituency. The cantons are of unequal population size and use different electoral systems. Six are single-member constituencies in which winners are determined by first-past-the-post voting; the remaining 20 cantons are multi-member constituencies, in which members are elected by open list proportional representation. Voters may cross out names on party lists, split their vote between parties (a system known as panachage), or draw up their own list on a blank ballot. Seats are allocated using the Hagenbach-Bischoff system.

National Council seats are apportioned to the cantons based on their respective population size (which includes children and resident foreigners who do not have the right to vote). Based on the official population count recorded at the end of 2016, Bern and Lucerne each lost a seat while Geneva and Vaud each gained a seat. The least-populous cantons have just one seat in the National Council — in 2019 there are six such cantons, four of which are half-cantons.

The rules regarding who can stand as a candidate and vote in elections to the National Council are uniform across the Confederation. Only Swiss citizens aged at least 18 can stand or vote and the citizens resident abroad can register to vote in the canton in which they last resided (or their canton of citizenship, otherwise) and be able to vote no matter how long since, or whether they ever have, lived in Switzerland.

The 46 members of the Council of States are elected in 20 two-seat constituencies (representing the 20 'full' cantons) and six single-member constituencies (representing the six half-cantons). Two 'full' cantons with small populations — Uri and Glarus — have therefore each two seats in the Council of States but only one seat each in the much larger National Council. In Jura and Neuchâtel the elections are held using proportional representation, whilst the other 24 use the majority system. 

In the first round of voting, candidates must obtain an absolute majority of the vote in order to be elected. If no candidate receives an absolute majority in the first round of voting then a second round is held in which a simple plurality is sufficient to be elected. The top two finishing candidates in the second round are elected.

As each canton regulates its election to the Council of States, the rules regarding who can stand as a candidate and vote in these elections varies canton-by-canton. Jura and Neuchâtel allow certain foreign residents to vote, whilst Glarus allows 16- and 17-year-olds the vote. Swiss citizens abroad registered to vote in a canton are permitted to vote in that canton's Council of States election only if the canton's law allows it. Schaffhausen has compulsory voting, though limited in implementation by way of only an insignificant fine.

Parties can cooperate as political groups, called parliamentary groups in switzerland. Members of the National Council are required to be in a political group in order to be able to sit on a committee.

Contesting parties 
The table below lists contesting parties represented in the Federal Assembly before the election.

Other parties contesting in at least three cantons are:
 Federal Democratic Union 
 Alternative List 
 Pirate Party 
 Christian Social Party 
 Swiss Democrats 
 Integral Politics

Opinion polls

Graphical summary
The chart below depicts opinion polls conducted for the 2019 Swiss federal election; trendlines are local regressions (LOESS).

Vote share

Results
The Green Party and Green Liberal Party gained votes and seats while most other parties decreased in size. The Gallagher index for this election, a measure of non-proportionality, reached 2.46.

National Council

Council of States

Elected candidates by canton

Canton of Aargau

Canton of Appenzell Ausserrhoden

Canton of Appenzell Innerrhoden

Canton of Basel-Landschaft

Canton of Basel-Stadt

Canton of Bern

Canton of Fribourg

Canton of Geneva

Canton of Glarus

Grisons

Canton of Jura

Canton of Lucerne

Canton of Neuchâtel

Canton of Nidwalden

Canton of Obwalden

Canton of Schaffhausen

Canton of Schwyz

Canton of Solothurn

Canton of St. Gallen

Canton of Thurgau

Canton of Ticino

Canton of Uri

Canton of Valais

Canton of Vaud

Canton of Zug

Canton of Zurich

Aftermath
The 2019 federal election was followed by the Federal Council election on 11 December 2019. The Green Party failed to win a seat in the Federal Council despite becoming the fourth largest party in the National Council.

See also
List of members of the National Council of Switzerland, 2019–23

References

Further reading
 Bernhard, Laurent (2020). "The 2019 Swiss Federal Elections: The Rise of the Green Tide". West European Politics 43 (6): 1339–1349. .
 Giger, Nathalie; Traber, Denise; Gilardi, Fabrizio; Bütikofer, Sarah (2022). "The surge in women's representation in the 2019 Swiss federal elections". Swiss Political Science Review 28(2): 361–376.
 Gilardi, Fabrizio; Gessler, Theresa; Kubli, Maël; Müller, Stefan (2022). "Issue Ownership and Agenda Setting in the 2019 Swiss National Elections". Swiss Political Science Review 28(2): 190–208.

External links
Elections 2019 Swiss Confederation

Switzerland
Federal election
Federal elections in Switzerland
Federal election
Federal